Tekno Comix was an American publishing company that produced comic books from 1995 to 1997.

History
The company was founded by Laurie Silvers and Mitchell Rubenstein as a division of their publicly traded company, Big Entertainment. Tekno Comix publications featured characters and situations created by celebrity authors and others, but were primarily scripted and illustrated by freelance comics creators.

The Tekno Comix brand was discontinued in 1996, though books featuring the same characters continued were published with Big Entertainment branding into 1997. Big Entertainment continues as Hollywood Media Corp, which controls Tekno Comix intellectual property.

Titles
 Beach High, #1 (1997), under Big Entertainment imprint
 Gene Roddenberry's Lost Universe, # 1–7 (1995)
 Gene Roddenberry's Xander in Lost Universe, #0–8 (1995–1996)
 Isaac Asimov's I-Bots
v1, #1–7 (1995–1996)
v2, #1–9 (1996–1997), under Big Entertainment imprint
 John Jakes' Mullkon Empire, #1–6 (1995–1996)
 Leonard Nimoy's Primortals
v1, #1–15 (1995)
Origins, #1–2 (1995)
v2, #1–8 (1996), under Big Entertainment imprint
 Mickey Spillane's Mike Danger
v1, #1–11 (1995–1996)
v2, #1–10 (1996–1997), under Big Entertainment imprint
 Neil Gaiman's Lady Justice
v1, #1–11 (1995–1996)
v2, #1–9 (1996–1997), under Big Entertainment imprint
 Neil Gaiman's Mr. Hero the Newmatic Man
v1, #1–17 (1995–1996)
v2, #1 (1996), under Big Entertainment imprint
 Neil Gaiman's Phage: Shadow Death, #1–6 (1996), under Big Entertainment imprint
 Neil Gaiman's Teknophage
v1, #1–10 (1995–1996)
Teknophage versus Zeerus, #1 (1996), under Big Entertainment imprint
 Neil Gaiman's Wheel of Worlds, #0–1 (1995–1996)
 Tad Williams' Mirror World: Rain, #0–1 (1997), under Big Entertainment imprint
 Tekno Comix Handbook, #1 (1996)
 Neuro Jack, #1 (1996), under Big Entertainment imprint

Notes

References

Comic book publishing companies of the United States
Defunct comics and manga publishing companies
Publishing companies established in 1995
Mass media companies disestablished in 1997
1995 establishments in Florida
1997 disestablishments in Florida
Defunct companies based in Florida